Dalton is a civil parish in the West Lancashire district of Lancashire, England.  It contains ten buildings that are recorded in the National Heritage List for England as designated listed buildings.  Of these, one is at Grade II*, the middle grade, and the others are at Grade II, the lowest grade.  The parish contains the village of Dalton, and is otherwise rural.  Most of the listed buildings are farmhouses, or houses and associated structures, the others being a church, and a landmark in the form of a beacon.


Key

Buildings

References

Citations

Sources

Lists of listed buildings in Lancashire
Buildings and structures in the Borough of West Lancashire